Greenwood Academy may refer to:

Greenwood Academy, Birmingham, a secondary school in Birmingham, West Midlands, England
Greenwood Academy, Dreghorn, a secondary school in Dreghorn, North Ayrshire, Scotland
Greenwood Academies Trust, a multi-academy trust in the English Midlands.

See also
Greenwood (disambiguation)
Greenwood High School (disambiguation)